Siddavesa kind of religious and traditional folk dance it is also called as pursere kaṭṭunā and puruṣa makkaḷa kuṇita. Tulu Gowda people of Sullia, Belthangady, Puttur are performing full moon summer dance in month of Tulu calendar Suggi. In this same month, Suggi Nalike also performed. Siddavesha are performing late evening until morning and visiting all stratum people home.

About
The Siddavesa influenced by Natha pantha. They performing in full night enactment with myth mimic, acting, singing and dancing. Participants of Siddavesha has different characters, they are interact with themselves and the public in different stages of enactment. The three main mythical farce characters of Siddavesha are Sanyasi, Bhatru and Dasayye.

Dress and costume
There are number different characters are performing Dasayya, Bhatru, Sansyasi, Koraga, Koti Chennaya, Beetle Purbu, Byari, piliyesa etc. Dasayya appears in white dhoti and red shawl, holding in his hand with a conch and drum. The Head is covered by Mundasu and lengthed nama in the forehead. The Bhartu, a village priest with sacred thread janivara with a big knot, white dhoti, smears his body with sandalwood paste and forehead with sandal paste and kunkum. The sanyasi wears an unusual dress, he is the main part of this mythical dance, he is fully covered with camouflage plantation dried leaves. He is provided with a huge pennies made up of 4-5 wooden sticks tied together which protrudes from his waist. Koraga pastes dark colour to his whole body. Byari with white banian, Multicolored checks printed dhoti and the knot of dhoti bit above the waist so it has been not to have touched the ground, and with tradition toppy.

Performance
After sunset, the performed artist meets the pre-decided holy place, mainly in front of daivradhane chavadi or Guttu house. They dress up with using locally available costumes after prayer conducted and the eldest persons prayed the Kadri Manjunatha, his local spirits and ancestors. The group of these people move house to house of their region, they perform their courtyard. A lamp is the lit centre of the arena or near the Tuḷasi kaṭṭe.

When the team arrives at the house of their first performance they send the Samnyasi into hiding beside the house. The rest of them walk up to the courtyard of the house and wake up the people. They set up a lighted lamp in the centre courtyard and commence dancing around to it with one of them initiating the song as follows:
Sidduliṅga mudduliṅga - sid'dhavēsō. 
Nāvu yāvūru yāva taḷa - sid'dhavēsō.
Nāvu kāśīya taḷadavru - sid'dhavēsō
All the performer performs as per their character predetermined by the head of the team, mostly who is eldest. The Samnyasi is left alone on the stage of Siddavesa's performance, and he roams around the courtyard holding his pseudo pennies made by 4-5 wooden sticks tied together. He talks about unusual sexual words and naughty words.

When they are walking on the street, utter Ḍimbisāle, Ḍimbisāle in a louder voice. This is the indication of the Siidavesa performer are on the way yet to come to the house.

Belief
Suppose chennu nalike, performed by mera community accidentally meets Siddavesa on the way, it is considered as a bad omen. So the siddavesa performer always utters  Ḍimbisāle chorus on their way to home to home very loudly.

Photo Gallery

References

Dakshina Kannada district
Culture of Tulu Nadu
Culture of Mangalore